Smithy may refer to:
 Forge, also called a smithy, the workplace of a smith or a blacksmith
 Smithy (1924 film), a silent American film starring Stan Laurel
 Smithy (1933 film), a British comedy-drama film starring Edmund Gwenn
 Smithy (1946 film), an Australian film based on Sir Charles Kingsford Smith's flight across the Pacific Ocean
 Smithy (Mario), the main villain of the video game Super Mario RPG

Smithy is also a documented nickname for a number of notable people and fictional characters:
 Sir Charles Kingsford Smith (1897–1935), Australian pioneer aviator
 Ian Smith (1919–2007), Prime Minister of Rhodesia and World War II Royal Air Force pilot
 W. G. G. Duncan Smith (1914–1996), World War II flying ace
 Mike Smith (broadcaster) (1955–2014), British television and radio presenter, racing driver, pilot and businessman
 Dale Smith (The Bill), a fictional character on the television series The Bill
 Neil "Smithy" Smith, fictional character on the television series Gavin & Stacey played by actor James Corden